Hot Wheels: AcceleRacers is a 2005 computer-animated series of four films produced by Canadian company Mainframe Entertainment, which also produced the television series ReBoot. Available on DVD and VHS, it has also been shown on Cartoon Network.

A sequel to the 2003 film Hot Wheels: World Race, the series takes place two years after the World Race in California, and puts Mattel's Hot Wheels toy cars in a ReBoot-like situation. The films were distributed by Warner Bros. Television and the soundtrack was distributed by Sony BMG. A collectible card game, which was shown in the DVD bonus, and other merchandise were also made.

The series aired on Cartoon Network in 2005: Ignition (January 8), The Speed of Silence (March 19), Breaking Point (June 25) and The Ultimate Race (October 1).

Plot
Two years after the end of the World Race, Dr. Peter Tezla continues to study the information he gathered on the Wheel of Power while it was in his possession. However, he finds that Gelorum has returned fully repaired, now with her army of Racing Drones and is attempting to steal the Wheel of Power again. Tezla enters Highway 35 himself and attempts to stop Gelorum but fails and is greatly injured as the Drones capture the Wheel. He manages to escape back to Earth, and the Drones turn Hot Wheels City into their new headquarters.

Meanwhile, in present-day California, former World Race drivers Vert Wheeler, Kurt Wylde, Taro Kitano, and Mark Wylde have now become members of two street racing teams: the Teku and the Metal Maniacs. During a grudge race on the coastline, Dr. Tezla's robotic assistant Gig appears, telling the World Race drivers that Dr. Tezla needs their help. Arriving at Dr. Tezla’s old base from the World Race, with some of their new teammates, they find it partially destroyed. Former Dune Ratz driver Brian Kadeem appears and takes them to the AcceleDrome, Dr. Tezla's new base. After the drivers arrive, Dr. Tezla appears on a large hologram in the middle of the cavern and tells them what he has found: new Acceleron knowledge from the Wheel of Power's research. Now that the Wheel has been taken from its spire in Highway 35, the Drones have control over the dimension’s portals.

Each of the symbols on the Wheel represents one of the Racing Realms, inter-dimensional worlds that have tracks that go through a single element in the hardest way possible for driving conditions (there are only fifteen Realms in the series, twelve that were actually shown and three that the Drones had already completed before the beginning of the series, but only the AcceleChargers from those three are shown). The Drones have been entering the Realms, and each time a Realm is finished, the first driver to reach the end of the track obtains an AcceleCharger, which gives a car the ability to drive through any condition that relates to the realm that it was won in. Discovering that the Wheel hologram is always in sync with the actual Wheel, it functions as an inter-dimensional portal to the Racing Realms (it should also be noted that the Drones have their own Wheel hologram portal as well, due to them capturing the actual Wheel). The drivers enter the realms to try to stop the Drones but find it harder than the World Race because the Wheel itself decides when to open the Realms and that each Realm only stays open for one hour with no way out but the finish line.

As the race to stop the Drones rages on, drivers are trapped in the Realms, grudges between the teams grow, and a new enemy force known as the Silencerz appears, attempting to defeat both the Drones and the humans with the same Wheel hologram technology that the other drivers currently share. As the race to stop the Drones reaches its end, the secret of the Acceleron's test comes to unveil itself: the Racing Realms were designed to create "the perfect driver" and the AcceleChargers were created as keys to having the Wheel of Power open a portal to the Acceleron home world.

Films

Characters

AcceleDrome Crew
The AcceleDrome Crew is a team that resides in the AcceleDrome, guiding the racers throughout the Racing Realms.
 Dr. Peter Tezla (voiced by Michael Donovan): Dr. Tezla abandoned the Cube from World Race and went into hiding in the AcceleDrome where he conducted research centered on the Wheel of Power. Once he discovered the nature of the Wheel of Power and the Racing Realms, Dr. Tezla recruited former World Race drivers to help him compete in the Racing Realms for the power of the AcceleChargers. Hunted by Gelorum and the Racing Drones, Dr. Tezla is a very secretive man sharing information only if he decides the person needs to know it. This generates some distrust amongst those he leads – especially Kurt Wylde who has never trusted Tezla. Despite his secretive nature, his most trusted companion is Gig, a floating computer/robot. Dr. Tezla was crippled in the attempt to keep the Drones from the Wheel of Power – he now walks and stands with the aid of motorized braces. Dr. Tezla also has some sort of connection with the Silencerz. When questioned about this apparent connection, he claims to be the victim of theft. Later we learn that Dr. Tezla used to work for the Silencers, but then left them taking some of their technology, including Gig. Revealing their technology, Dr. Tezla took credit for it all and became rich.
 Lani Tam (voiced by Venus Terzo): A former World Race driver and member of the Wave Rippers team, she now works for Dr. Tezla in the AcceleDrome as crew chief, medic and mechanic. At the end of the World Race, she became involved with Taro Kitano. Their relationship seemed to have gone sour by the time AcceleRacers begins (Taro said Lani told him he was "hard to talk to"). Though Lani periodically shows that she may have feelings still for Taro, the actions are never reciprocated. However, Lani may be developing feelings for Nolo, as they are seen together quite often in the films and have an easy-going relationship with each other.
 Gig (voiced by Kasper Michaels): A floating computer/robot, Gig is Dr. Tezla's seemingly loyal companion and sidekick. An X-88 robot, Gig was stolen from the Silencerz when Dr. Tezla left that team. Dr. Tezla thought he'd reprogrammed Gig, but it turned out that Gig was playing the part of the spy – feeding Dr. Tezla's information back to the Silencerz. Gig's deception was discovered by Lani in the film The Ultimate Race. Shortly thereafter, Gig gave his life to destroy the Racing Drones army by personally detonating the Nitrox 2 storage tanks in the AcceleDrome. The AcceleRacers website (Cartoon Network) hints that Gig's electronic brain is vulnerable to tampering. He is now deceased.
 Brian Kadeem (voiced by Cusse Mankuma): Kadeem, a former World Race driver, led the drivers into the Storm Realm, but was lost when he was forced off the track by RD-1. He was captured by the Racing Drones and taken to their headquarters. After refusing to disclose the location of the AcceleDrome to Gelorum, Kadeem's intestines and reproductive system were mercilessly uninstalled to allow Gelorum to stuff robotic compartments into him, forcing him as a slave under her control. Kadeem did not survive the process. He died pleading Gelorum to stop the conversion process. As a cyborg, Kadeem was missing his original legs and crotch, one arm, and his hair was wired with Drone technology. His carcass was last seen falling off the building the Drones used to capture him and then Markie in after refusing to help them, stating that "Kadeem is gone!". It is never revealed if he survived the fall.

Metal Maniacs
The Metal Maniacs are one of the two racing teams in the Hot Wheels AcceleRacers series. They are a group of muscular, wrestler-like, rough neck drivers whose vehicles are a mixture of scrap metal and racing car components reminiscent of old-style muscle cars. They have a raucous and reckless driving style with the cars to match. They have a fierce rivalry with the Teku.
 Tork Maddox (voiced by Adrian Holmes): The current leader of the Metal Maniacs. Tork has a rivalry with Nolo Pasaro, the current leader of the Teku, who blames Tork for the death of his older brother, Tone. In truth, Tork did not cause Tone's death, but allows Nolo to blame him because Tork believes himself to be responsible, nevertheless. Often suffering from nightmares of the race, during which he hits Tone's rear bumper causing him to spin out and crash. He always restrains himself when Nolo tries to get revenge on him for killing his brother, telling him he doesn't want to fight him. When Nolo comes to terms with that fact, they eventually become friends. Tork also loves sports, fighting, and racing. His only car in the AcceleRacers series is "Hollowback".
 Taro Kitano (voiced by Kevan Ohtsji): A former racing champion and former team leader of the Scorchers in Highway 35, he is a millionaire that has climbed Mount Everest and skied down it twice. A calm and collected racer who respects the Teku's Vert Wheeler and Karma Eiss. He used to date Lani Tam, but they broke up as she later commented, "They didn't talk much". He appears to be attracted to the equally calm and collected Karma, whom he admits is an extremely good driver. His first car in the series is '70's Plymouth Road Runner, a repaint of his car from Highway 35 and then Riveted. Taro received an unusual redesign since Highway 35, notably having an unusual skull shape.
 Diesel "Porkchop" Riggs (voiced by David Kaye): Undefeated in racing until he raced against the Teku. He has a rivalry with Teku member Shirako Takamoto, mainly because he doesn't like the music Shirako listens to. Porkchop has a strong relationship with Maniac mechanic Mitchell "Monkey" Mclurg. He initially drives the car "Jack Hammer" and motorcycle "Jaw Jammer", but changes to the car "Piledriver" towards the end of the series. He usually comes to the rescue of Monkey, such as when the Racers needed to hijack one of the Racing Drones' "Sweepers"(basically a big rig the Drones use to capture racers) that Porkchop and Monkey had to get inside. The Sweeper's driver caught Monkey and Porkchop came through the wall and punched its head off. Porkchop had a childhood fear of water, which caused him big trouble in the water realm, then he froze up and didn't hit the EDR (emergency driver return) device until water came in and was about to drown him. He came out of the portal at the same speed he was going, landing on a conveniently placed pile of cardboard boxes and supplies, though he was still hurt. Later in the infirmary Monkey talked to him about it. Porkchop then told him about how he saw his father drowned when he was a kid. Monkey comically asked if that was why he's never taken a bath. Angered, Porkchop replied by saying that he took a bath... ONCE. Since then he seemed to get over his fear.
 Mark "Markie" Wylde (voiced by Will Sanderson): A former member of Vert's old team, the Wave Rippers. Far from the innocent racer who reconciled with his older brother, Kurt Wylde, at the end of Highway 35, Markie is aggressive, short-tempered, and easily riled by his older brother and Tork. Apparently before the AcceleRacers saga began, Kurt talked Markie into joining a "business deal", but he ended up arrested when things went wrong, and he refused to give up. After two years in prison, Markie joined the Metal Maniacs and refused to acknowledge his brother for abandoning him. He is determined to prove himself, even if it means breaking the rules. After the Metro Realm, he gets extremely angry towards Monkey and Tork; at Monkey for losing his car to the Sweeper, and at Tork for letting Monkey take the car in the first place. After this, Tork doesn't let Markie drive in the Realms because of his determination to get back at Kurt, other than winning. His first car is "Spinebuster", his second is "Flathead Fury". His previous World Race Wave Rippers car was a Corvette Stingray. It is unknown what happened to it after the World Race. He was a convict and him being a racer meant that he probably tried to drive away when the police were after him. Seeing as he was caught with his car might have been taken as evidence and later auctioned off. Between Tork letting Monkey race in and lose his car, and Tork not letting him race, Markie had enough of Tork and challenged him for leadership of the Metal Maniacs, racing to Dr. Tezla's old base and back. In the final leg he and Tork were neck-and-neck for the lead. But Tork remembered Tone's crash during their race. The shock of almost reliving the event caused Tork to hit the brakes, letting Markie win. However, his victory was short lived as a racing portal had opened when he and Tork were racing, and the other Maniacs had left. When the next portal opened Markie tried to get back at Tork by having PorkChop race instead of him. PorkChop, however, still had respect for Tork and wouldn't race in Tork's place. No one else on the team would either. Outraged, Markie left the team. Though in the Junk Realm, Markie still tried to get the Maniacs to do what he said. In the Junk Realm he crashes his car and has been captured by the Drones, leading Kurt to bring the Metal Maniacs and Teku together to infiltrate the Drones' headquarters using a Sweeper, Kurt soon sees that the Drones had replaced his arm with a Drone arm. After saving Kurt from a Drone controlled Kadeem, Mark thanks Kurt for coming back for him, which ends their conflict for good.
 Mitchell "Monkey" Mclurg (voiced by Andrew Duncan): The jumpy (both figuratively and literally) mechanic of the Metal Maniacs, who has a bit of a crush on Lani Tam; his feelings are unreciprocated, and Lani shows no interest in him aside from disgust at times. Monkey would rather be in the garage than on the racetrack, but is a capable racer, nonetheless. He formulated the more powerful "Nitrox-3½" fuel and constructed Sparky the Robot from recovered Racing Drone parts. He dislikes his real name and prefers to be called Monkey. Monkey's first car is "Rollin' Thunder", his second car is "Spinebuster" that he raced at Metro Realm, and he had gotten into trouble with a Sweeper, his third car is the "Rat-ified". Together, he and Porkchop drove a big rig they liked to call "Old Smokey". Monkey usually doesn't think things through. Such as when he told Sparky, who is always shooting off sparks, to fill up Old Smokey's tank with highly explosive Nitrox-3½. Luckily Lani pointed it out and Monkey stopped Sparky before anything could happen. Another example of this was when the racers were in the Junk realm (which he considered beautiful) and they were outnumbered by the Racing Drones "Sweepers". Monkey and PorkChop drove Old Smokey filled with Nitrox-3½ through the portal. Confident that they would just use the EDR to escape. Dr. Tezla then reminded him that it was meant to return only one person. Horrified, Monkey pleaded to PorkChop to slow down so he could jump out the window before they got to the portal.
 Sparky (voiced by Andrew Duncan): A funny and annoying robot created by Monkey. He was an RD-S1 before he was pulled through the portal by Vert on his Deora II, and he was soon rammed into a wall by Karma. He was also tested by Karma and Gig to learn how the Drones win the realms. In "The Speed of Silence" he used a transmitter and stole a car to escape, but he was smashed by Markie. In "Breaking Point" Monkey re-built him with different parts, including a mop basket, baseball cap, bicycle flag, a new robotic arm and mouth, goggles, racing start lights, and a MD-01's legs brought from Shirako. In "Ultimate Race" Sparky helps Vert to win the race with racing skills so he can become an AcceleRacer.

Teku
The Teku are the second racing team in AcceleRacers. The Teku cars have emphasis on looks and sound, so their cars are tricked out to not only look good but to sound good as well, similar to Import Tuners. The word Teku is derived from the Japanese pronunciation of the word "Tech", and the logo for the Teku is also the Japanese writing for it (テク).
 Nolo Pasaro (voiced by Dexter Bell): After his brother Tone died, Nolo took over leadership of the Teku. Aggressive and stubborn, many of Nolo's early actions seemed to stem from his hatred of Tork, whom he blamed for his brother's death. Also, a jealous leader, Nolo also doesn't seem to like any question of his judgment or abilities, which caused major strife between him and Vert (who was just itching for a chance to take over and prove himself). Nolo puts his hatred of Tork aside during the Metro Realm when Tork saved him from the Racing Drones. Interaction between Nolo and Tork was still strained in Breaking Point, most likely due to the vacuum left by Nolo's past hatred. Nolo isn't foaming at the mouth anymore, which leaves time for Nolo to become a better leader of the Teku. During the events in The Ultimate Race, Nolo had finally let go of his hatred for Tork; They worked together in the Cosmic Realm and in the Racing Drones Headquarters. Nolo finally admits that Tone's death was the result of Tone's careless driving and not Tork's fault (of hitting the car so it would go out of control). At the end of the film, Nolo hangs up Tone's necklace on the Highway 35 sign and joins Tork to go look for Vert. He drove the car "Synkro", but later replaces it with "SpecTyte" and briefly drives "High Voltage". When Tone asked him if he wanted to be leader, Nolo said it would be a lot of work. But Tone said he just had to stay in the groove.
 Josef "Vert" Wheeler (voiced by Andrew Francis): Former leader of the Wave Rippers and winner of the World Race. Eighteen years old, Vert Wheeler is now a member of the Teku team helping Dr. Tezla. Vert at one time believed he was the better driver and leader and was at constant odds with Nolo Passaro, the leader of the Teku. After repeated personal failures in both Ignition and Speed of Silence, Vert finally realized that he's not as good as he thought he was. He gave up and left, disappearing before the teams went into the Metro Realm. After some time away for personal reflection, Vert returned in Breaking Point just in time to race in the Junk Realm. His time away seemed to mellow his relationship with Nolo. During The Ultimate Race, Vert was again feeling sorry for himself. Regretting his decision to not accompany the other drivers on the rescue mission to the Racing Drones' Headquarters, Vert stayed behind when the Cosmic realm opened. It worked out for the best though, as he was the only one to avoid being capture and ended up following Gelorum into the Ultimate Race. During the race, Vert showed his maturity. Staying level-headed and using his driving skills flawlessly, he was able to keep up with Gelorum who had access to all the AcceleChargers. At the end of the Ultimate Race, Vert was granted the honor of being a true AcceleRacer by the Accelerons. Vert declined to follow the Acceleron to its home world, instead choosing to return to help his captured friends. He says: "Wisdom is a circle, what you receive you must give back". He succeeded in helping them escape but was subsequently caught by the Silencerz. In the final scene, it was shown that his father was associated with the Silencerz as Vert's father says that they need to talk. He first drove "Deora II", a repaint of his car from Highway 35. But the Deora II gets cut in half coming out of the Storm Realm. He later switches to "Power Rage" and then "Reverb". He also drove a motorcycle named "Nightlife". Also, there is an editing error between Highway 35 and AcceleRacers where Vert's eyes change from brown in World Race to light blue in AcceleRacers. Vert later appeared in Hot Wheels Battle Force 5 as the main character. However, he seems to be completely different aside from his blonde hair and blue eyes.
 Kurt Wylde (voiced by Brian Drummond): Mark Wylde's older brother and former leader of the Street Breed in Highway 35. Now quiet and standoffish, he’s a much calmer Kurt that's attempting to prove himself to the Teku and the Metal Maniacs in AcceleRacers. Kurt is still facing the consequences of his actions in the World Race, however, through suspicions from the other drivers and hostility from his younger brother, Mark Wylde. It has been suggested on the AcceleRacers website (Cartoon Network) that Kurt is substituting his relationship with Nolo in place of the failed one with Mark. A major sub-plot in AcceleRacers is the relationship between Kurt and Mark Wylde. Mark ended up in prison because of a shady business deal Kurt involved him in. Kurt, fearing personal ruin, failed to help Markie with the subsequent legal troubles. In The Ultimate Race, Kurt redeems himself by bringing together the Teku and the Metal Maniacs in the rescue effort to get Markie from the Racing Drones. Markie seemed to forgive Kurt after that. Additionally, Kurt has been shown in a number of flashbacks opposing Markie's membership in the Metal Maniacs after Mark’s prison sentence. He drove "Sling Shot", a repaint of his car from Highway 35, until it gets flipped over and loses a wheel in the storm realm. He then changes to "Battle Spec".
 Shirako Takamoto (voiced by Kirby Morrow): Primarily concerned with things besides being first to the finish line, Shirako almost always seems like he's back towards the rear of the pack. When he does take the lead, it’s during times when he can also look good doing it. Porkchop seems especially irritated by Shirako and his loud music (which Shirako listens to at almost all times). He drove the car "Bassline" and the motorcycle "Nightlife". Has a record from since the beginning of Ignition up to Ultimate Race.
 Karma Eiss (voiced by Lisa Ann Beley): Calm and collected, Karma is all about overcoming challenges – the harder the better. Additionally, it seems that overcoming challenges means overcoming them perfectly to her. Determined to find the best way to solve problems, she's usually the first one to figure things out. Karma also worked with the captured RD-S1 in Speed of Silence to discover a better understanding of the Racing Drones, how they drive and how to beat them. Karma seems to have a lingering distrust of Kurt because of his shadowy past with Gelorum. On the other hand, Karma may be developing a relationship with Taro, a result of their similar personalities. Karma's car was "Chicane".
 Tone Pasaro (voiced by Craig Veroni): Tone Pasaro was Nolo's older brother and founder of the Teku team. During a race with Tork Maddox, Tone lost control of his car, crashed and died in the explosion. For Nolo, Tone serves as a guide from the spirit world through various flashbacks. Though Tone taught his brother many useful social and driving concepts, Nolo's anger toward Tork over the accident colored many of Nolo's actions. In Speed of Silence, Karma Eiss expresses her opinion that Tone was not quite the driver that Nolo remembers. Later in the film The Ultimate Race, Nolo finally admits that Tone's death was caused by Tone, not Tork. Tone was driving "Synkro" during the flashbacks of the fateful race where he lost his life.

Racing Drones
Originally built by the Accelerons as test drivers, these robots became a problem as they would do anything to win. The Racing Drones were abandoned on Earth when the Accelerons returned to their home world. Gelorum, their leader, ruled with an iron fist as she had no concern for life – robotic or organic. Now that the Racing Realms are open, the Racing Drones are free to enter and win AcceleChargers. The Racing Drones excel in manufacturing, building drivers and vehicles in mass quantities and to the required specifications. They also have the ability to reproduce and send AcceleCharger powers to drivers in need.
 Gelorum (voiced by Kathleen Barr): She is the primary villain from the World Race series and later became the main antagonist in the AcceleRacers series. In AcceleRacers, Gelorum is the member of her own team called the Racing Drones. In World Race series, Gelorum was the chief mastermind at CLYP Corporation. Then, she hired Zed-36 to sabotage the track and harm the racers, so Gelorum can get the chance of getting the Wheel of Power. Then, she sent Zed-36 and the other robots to get the Wheel of Power ahead of the other drivers. At Hot Wheels City, Gelorum got damaged by the wreck of her helicopter. Then, it was revealed that Gelorum was a robot. Then, she was able to prevent the return of the Wheel of Power to the Hot Wheels City but was stopped by Kurt Wylde who was formerly Zed-36. Gelorum was able to get to a portal, vowing that "this is NOT the end of the race." In AcceleRacers, Gelorum's face and body bear the scars of her past battle at the end of the World Race series. In Ignition, she orders RD-L1 to destroy Tezla after crashing but when Tezla pulled the EDR and escaped, this caused the Racing Drone to get angry and throw Nitrium into pieces, she also orders RD-L1 to capture Kadeem after getting lost in the storm realm. In Breaking Point, she was a racing drone constructed by the Accelerons. In the Ruins Realm, the 3.3 mini episode on, Gelorum's origins were revealed that she was in her robot form to lead the drones exile on Earth. In The Ultimate Race, Gelorum shows her true form when she discards her "human" shell to attack Vert after having deprived victory by the Acceleron due to using AcceleChargers. The Acceleron attacks, sending Gelorum spinning off the road during her fight with Vert Wheeler.
 RD-L1 (voiced by Mark Oliver): Short for Racing Drone Lieutenant, they serve as Gelorum's second-in-command, leading the drones into realms.
 RD-S1: Short for Racing Drone Soldier.
 RD-W: Short for Racing Drone Worker.
 RD-M: Short for Racing Drone Motorcycle, also known as MD (which is short for Motorcycle Drone).
 Sweeper Drone Driver: Drives the Sweeper.
 Recon Drones: Floating robots.
 Sweeper Drones: Small robots that hide under a Sweeper. Commonly used by drones to sabotage vehicles.

Silencerz
The Silencerz are a secretive group of drivers who prefer to remain in the shadows and let the Teku, Metal Maniacs and Racing Drones fight it out. Commonly sporting the colors silver and purple (when not invisible or otherwise disguised,) they rely on stealth and deception to gain the upper hand over their competitors. The Silencerz' cars are named after elements on the Periodic Table and are far more advanced than even the Racing Drones' and rival or exceed Dr. Tezla's technology. The main body is made of liquid "smart metal," which demonstrates active cloaking and disguise capabilities, both of which also apply to the driver. The Silencerz' cars also show anti-gravity ability (driving on upside-down or sideways surfaces) and are equipped with EMP weapons as well as radio jammers. These various implements are used to sabotage the Racing Drones as well as Dr. Tezla's drivers, not only by directly disabling their cars but also by using disguises to sow distrust among the Teku and Metal Maniacs. Although the Silencerz' motivations are largely unknown, it is clear that they compete against Dr. Tezla's drivers as well as the Racing Drones.
 Major Jack "Rabbit" Wheeler (voiced by John Payne): The leader of the Silencerz and also a US Armed Force Major. He drives Iridium, Magnesium and Anthracite. He is also Vert Wheeler's father. He and Vert do not seem to have a very close relationship, despite his apparent acknowledgement of Vert after winning The World Race. In "Breaking Point," Jack confronts Vert about his racing with the Teku, calling them "Street Punks," and saying Vert "should quit what he's doing." While this interaction seems to show Jack's concern for his son Vert, Jack's dual role as head of the Silencerz places him in competition with the Teku, which most likely colors his opinion on his son's participation. Jack Wheeler is the only Silencer to have his face canonically revealed, and the only Silencer to talk. In the final scene of the series, Vert goes through the realm portal in the AcceleDrome comes out in the Silencerz headquarters. He is promptly escorted from his car and taken to the leader of the Silencerz. Jack removes his helmet, revealing his second identity, and says: "Son, we need to talk."
 Silencerz Drivers: Drivers that never talk nor show their faces, which are hidden by helmets. Fan theories posit some of the Silencerz drivers may be former drivers from The World Race, namely Alec Wood, Dan Dresden, and Banjee Castillo. These drivers are revealed to have been stranded in the racing realms, and conjecture says they were later saved and recruited by the Silencerz. This theory, although directly unsubstantiated, is given credence due to an unreleased action figure of Banjee in a Silencerz racing suit with his helmet removed.
 Silencerz Technicians: Scientists in strange outfits that hide their faces and never talk. They serve to assess the cars' performance and status prior to entering realms, as well as research the Wheel of Power and the history of the Accelerons. The extent of the Silencerz' knowledge and research is largely unknown, although they demonstrate technological capabilities and knowledge of the Racing Realms meeting or exceeding Dr. Tezla's.
 X-88: Floating robots that have the same functionality and default program as Peter Tezla's floating robot GIG. They overwrite any re-program attempts. GIG is unique in that he displays a level of sentience despite this.

Other
 Banjee Castillo, Alec "Hud" Wood, and Dan Dresden: Former World Racers who were lost in the Racing Realms before the events of Ignition while driving for Dr. Tezla. Banjee Castillo was in the Swamp Realm some time before Ignition as his car is seen briefly – abandoned and half submerged in the water with no one inside. It is unknown as to what happened to Alec Wood and Dan Dresden, other than Lani Tam describing Tezla's use of the three before Kadeem recruited the Teku and Metal Maniacs in Ignition. It is possible that Banjee had survived as he was not seen in his car, many fans believe that these drivers were rescued and recruited by the Silencerz. This is because according to an unreleased action figure toy line that would've set up the proposed fifth film that eventually got cancelled, Banjee was one of the Silencerz.
 Accelerons (voiced by Mark Oliver): Alien racers who created Gelorum and the Racing Drones a thousand years ago. They also created the Highway 35 tracks, the Wheel of Power, the Realms, Hyperpods, Wisdom Ring and the AcceleChargers. In Hot Wheels AcceleRacers Ultimate Race, from the Sphere, Gelorum used all the AcceleChargers to complete the realms and Vert Wheeler used racing skills for the test. The Acceleron used his powers to change Vert's outfit/clothes and helmet into an Acceleron's one. After Gelorum was defeated by the Acceleron, he turns Vert's car back where it was, and he opened the portal to turn back. After Vert changed his mind the Acceleron gave Vert Wheeler the ultimate lesson: What you receive you must give back. The Acceleron opens the portal so Vert could go back to the AcceleDrome and save his friends from the drones.
 Vert's mom:  Appeared in Breaking Point (only in a photograph). The pictures of Vert's mom also appear in Hot Wheels AcceleRacers - The Speed of Silence, on Monkeys bed side table just before the Metro Realm opens.

Racing realms
The Racing Realms, only 25 are known (only 16 are shown in the movies) are more dangerous than the ones on Highway 35. While Highway 35 was only the beginning, the Realms are another test for the drivers built by the Accelerons. The Wheel of Power decides which Racing Realm to open and when.

Realms seen in the cards
 Canyon Realm: A Racing Realm that crisscrosses over a deep canyon with sheer drops. The skill for this realm was landing jumps.
 Chrome Realm: A Racing Realm that has huge silver spheres that will crush/roll over a vehicle that gets in one's way. The skill for this realm could be telling what a reflection is and what is not.
 Wind Realm: A Racing Realm with savage vortexes of wind and tornadoes, flying debris, and swaying tracks. The skill could be driving through harsh winds.
 Solar Realm: A Racing Realm that ring around a sun that produces solar flares and intense heat. The skill could be driving with the sun in your eye or predicting when the solar flares would pop up.
 Labyrinth Realm: A Racing Realm with a tangle of twists and turns that is infested with Maze Minotaurs. The skill for this realm could be remembering your path when lost.
 Blizzard Realm: A Racing Realm with vicious snowstorms, zero visibility, fierce sleet, deep snow and giant yetis. The skill could be driving in icy weather.
 Cybergrid Realm: A Racing Realm with a supercharged track as well as a maze of 90 degree turns and electric countermeasures. The skill for this realm could be perfecting 90 degree turns.
 Reactor Realm: A Racing Realm with toxic spills, gators and patrol machines that cross the track, removing cars to slow to outrun them. The skill could be driving undistracted by sound.
 Desert Realm: A Racing Realm filled with quicksand, dangerous rock passages, sandstorms, and giant scorpions. The skill could be driving in desert conditions.
 Micro Realm: A Racing Realm where all cars become toy size and are supposed to be dumped onto a freeway filled with traffic. Hazards for the Realm are giant objects, mites and nano paradises.
 Fog Realm: A Racing Realm that is foggy, big objects and switchbacks drivers might run into. It was completed prior to the events portrayed in AcceleRacers. Its skill could be driving through the fog.
 Warped Realm: A Racing Realm where there are no laws of physics, not even gravity. The track varies in length, size and shape, twisting itself in some places making an illusion-like reality. It was completed prior to the events portrayed in AcceleRacers. The skill could be trying to stay on the track in bizarre conditions.
 Monument Realm: A Racing Realm that sends drivers through ancient tombs with descriptions of how to escape them, similar to the Ruins Realm. The skill could be predicting what happens next on the track before you see it. The realm was completed prior to the events portrayed of Ignition by the Racing Drones.

Realms seen in the movies
 Storm Realm: The Storm Realm is a Racing Realm with tracks that loop and curve around the sides of clouds. It is an electrically charged world of flickering lightning and booming thunder, powered by the pillars. The Storm Realm tests a driver's ability to focus and avoid visual distractions.
 Swamp Realm: The Swamp Realm features a winding track that curve through and around gigantic jungle trees growing from a fetid swamp below. Giant worms, giant mosquitoes, living vines, a swamp monster, and hungry creatures lurk in the shadows and are ready to take out the drivers. The track itself is alive and continuously growing, forcing drivers to constantly choose the best terrain at any given moment. The skill for this realm is choosing the line that provides optimal grip. 
 Cavern Realm: The dark and daunting Cavern Realm features sudden turns and stops, unexpected drops and dips, and sections of track that veer into total darkness as well as falling boulders, stalactites, stalagmites, and giant bats. The Accelerons created the Cavern Realm to test a driver's ability to drive in the dark while avoiding obstacles.
 Lava Realm: Huge flaming boulders, lava eruptions and geysers are just some of the dangers that drivers face in the Lava Realm. The Lava Realm tests a driver's ability to manage the wear limit of their wheels and tires. Normal tires cannot withstand the extreme heat without melting, but the Racing Drones' tires can. The skill for this realm is understanding tire wear, tire temperatures, and their effects on your vehicle's performance.
 Water Realm: The track in the Water Realm runs above on, and below the surface of a vast alien ocean. Sections of track that are completely submerged run through translucent tunnels. Periods of breaks prevent flooding, but allow cars, sea creatures, and some water to pass through. Ravenous sea creatures wait for unsuspecting drivers in the darkness. The Water Realm tests a driver's ability to control their vehicle while hydroplaning by avoiding overcorrection.
 Metro Realm: The Metro Realm offers a vast night-time cityscape to explore, eerily deserted and dotted with neon signage and streetlights. The interconnecting streets of this bizarre metropolis will force a driver to master the skills of braking, cornering and driving through traffic. Occasionally, massive semi-trucks plow through the traffic to steamroll unsuspecting drivers. The Metro Realm tests the driver's ability to brake, turn, and accelerate as smoothly as possible to maintain optimal balance and traction.
 Cliffside Realm: The Cliffside Realm is composed of continuous switchbacks and loops alongside a foggy towering cliff. Drivers will need to navigate hairpin turns while avoiding rockslides, falling trees and large flying vultures if they hope to make it to the end of the Cliffside Realm. The Cliffside Realm tests a driver's ability to drift a series of tight hairpin turns while still maintaining speed and control.
 Ice Realm: With a track made of slick ice that could collapse at any moment, the Ice Realm presents a chilling challenge for any driver. The Ice Realm tests a driver's ability to negotiate slick or otherwise questionable road surfaces.
 Pipeline Realm: The Neon Pipeline Realm is a unique Racing Realm that features a track running inside and around the outside of a huge pipeline, with many different paths to take, some even opening up at random. Complete with a massive spherical center, Pipeline Realm tests a driver's ability to drive at all angles (and even upside-down) on their way to the end of the track. The skill for this realm is drafting. Only by drafting to optimize aerodynamics could drivers make it through timed doors or pass through the wind tunnel at the ending portal.
 Junk Realm: The Junk Realm is a Racing Realm that will take drivers through a junkyard filled with scrap metal and rusty old cars. Piles of junk rain down upon the track, threatening to crush drivers underneath. There are also problems with piles of debris on the road, magnetized lifters, compactors, wrecking balls, and a big metal "fire-breathing dinosaur" known as the Mechanized Destroyer. The skill for the Junk realm is to "Hit the Apex!", effectively decreasing the angle of the turn and allowing you to use the car's full braking, acceleration, and cornering potential.
 Ruins Realm: The Ruins Realm is a Racing Realm with an atmosphere that evokes Easter Island and Stonehenge. The Ruins Realm is peppered with colossal living statues and stone buildings. With an ancient marble track that threatens to collapse at any time, four 4-headed stone creatures, and collapsing pillars, drivers must hone their skills if they want to win. The objective is to learn how to react to these sudden obstacles and navigate through them carefully. Reckless drivers will not make it out of here in one piece.
 Cosmic Realm: The Cosmic Realm is a Racing Realm that features a track composed of colorful planetary rings that lie suspended in space and surrounding a planet. Meteor showers and black holes are just a few of the hazards that this realm contains. The Cosmic realm was created to test a driver's ability to use high-speed control since the low-gravity environment requires the driver to produce as much down force as possible in order to avoid floating off the track.
 Sphere-world Realm: In the race between Vert and Gelorum, after both racers have passed through all the previously realms, they entered a place where the track is surrounded by white light. The show gives little information about that place, except that the winner is supposed to win a chance to race against the Acceleron at the end of the track by testing its own skills. Vert became a winner and earns the title of AcceleRacer in the process. The lesson is that wisdom is a circle and what you receive you must give back. Vert tried to keep Gelorum from finishing the race first by crashing into her car, but an Acceleron came out of the Sphere, and she approached him before he could get out of his overturned car. Although Gelorum arrived at the Sphere first, the Acceleron commended Vert for using his own skills to get through the realms, not the AcceleChargers, and gave Vert an outfit. Gelorum, deprived of her opportunity to race the Acceleron and exact vengeance, transformed into her true robotic form, ready to tear Vert to pieces, but the Acceleron catapulted here into the void beyond with his telekinetic powers, then flipped Vert's car, Reverb, right-side up. While Vert could've accepted the challenge to race him, he had to return to the AcceleDrome to save the others. The Acceleron bestowed him with a circle, then graciously opened an exit portal as Vert departed, telling him when he returned, Vert would not be alone.

AcceleChargers
AcceleChargers are powerful chips that are given to the driver who reaches the end of each Racing Realm. The AcceleChargers help vehicles in different locations depending on the realm you're in or in what conditions you are driving. While they provide drivers a certain edge when driving in the realms, the Accelerons do not accept drivers who complete the realms with their use; instead, they accept those who have overcome the challenges with their own unsupplemented abilities.

 Canyon Realm AcceleCharger: Hyper Jump: Allows the driver's cars to make extremely long and high jumps.
 Chrome Realm AcceleCharger: Undistort: Clarifies and removes any illusion or mirage seen to the driver.
 Wind Realm AcceleCharger: Wind Shark: Negates the effect of powerful winds.
 Solar Realm AcceleCharger: Anti Gravitation: Allows a driver's car to negate shifts of gravity and remain on the track.
 Labyrinth Realm AcceleCharger: Navigator: Manipulates a driver's GPS System and pinpoints all the right directions and leads you to the finish line.
 Blizzard Realm AcceleCharger: Total Traction: Allows traction on any terrain.
 Cybergrid Realm AcceleCharger: Folding Corners: Allows cars to snap 90 degree turns without the loss of speed or traction.
 Reactor Realm AcceleCharger: Sound Buffer: Negates all external noise or in other words, makes the driver's car soundproof.
 Desert Realm AcceleCharger: Sand Speed: Allows cars to safely travel on sand or unstable surfaces.
 Micro Realm AcceleCharger: Size Scaler: Allows cars to change size.
 Fog Realm AcceleCharger: Fog Vision: Allows the driver's vehicle to see clearly in foggy conditions. Won by the Racing Drones.
 Warped Realm AcceleCharger: Teleport: Allows the driver's vehicle to teleport to another area a short distance away, or to disappear and reappear. Won by the Racing Drones.
 Monument Realm AcceleCharger: 2-D: Allows the driver's vehicle to become two dimensional. Won by the Racing Drones.
 Storm Realm AcceleCharger: Lightning Rod: Protects the driver's car from electrical charges. Won by RD-L1.
 Swamp Realm AcceleCharger: Living Road: Creates an organic road of vines beneath the car. Won by Nolo Passaro.
 Cavern Realm AcceleCharger: Night Sight: Allows the driver to see in total darkness. Won by Diesel "Porkchop" Riggs.
 Lava Realm AcceleCharger: Invinci-Tires: Creates tires that always remain in perfect condition. Won by RD-L1.
 Water Realm AcceleCharger: Hydro Glide: Allows the driver's car the ability to drive on water. Won by RD-L1.
 Metro Realm AcceleCharger: Battering Bubble: Creates a force field around the car. Won by the Silencerz.
 Cliffside Realm AcceleCharger: Turn & Burn: Allows the car to take hairpin turns without slowing down or losing traction. Won by the Silencerz.
 Ice Realm AcceleCharger: Slip Grip: Gives the car the ability to maintain a firm grip over slippery terrain. Won by the Silencerz.
 Pipeline Realm AcceleCharger: Wall Crawl: Allows the driver's car to drive upside down or on walls. Won by the Silencerz.
 Junk Realm AcceleCharger: Frictionless: Creates a frictionless track under the car. Won by Kurt Wylde.
 Ruins Realm AcceleCharger: Phantom Form: Allows the driver's car to pass through objects. Won by Racing Drones.
 Cosmic Realm AcceleCharger: Light Speed: Allows the driver's car to travel at lightspeed. Won by the Silencerz.

List of Hot Wheels cars

Teku
 Power Rage - Driven by Vert Wheeler. This car replaced the Deora II that Vert previously drove during the events of World Race. It is destroyed when Vert oversteers his car in the Water Realm.
 Battle Spec - Driven by Kurt Wylde
 High Voltage - Driven by Nolo Pasaro
 Nightlife - (Motorcycle-type) Driven by Shirako Takamoto and Vert Wheeler
 Chicane - Driven by Karma Eiss
 SpecTyte - Driven by Nolo Pasaro
 Synkro - Driven by Tone Pasaro and Nolo Pasaro, 
 Bassline - Driven by Shirako Takamoto.
 Reverb - Driven by Vert Wheeler
 Drift Tech - Driven by Unknown (Never shown in the movie)
 Deora II - Driven by Vert Wheeler (Repainted World Race: Wave Rippers vehicle). Destroyed and cut in half by an RD-S1 in the Storm Realm
 Sling Shot - Driven by Kurt Wylde (Repainted World Race: Street Breed vehicle)

Metal Maniacs
 Hollowback - Driven by Tork Maddox.
 Jaw Jammer/Airy 8 - (Motorcycle-type) Driven by Diesel "Porkchop" Riggs.
 Riveted - Driven by Taro Kitano. The vehicle somewhat resembles a Ford Mustang Mach 1.
 Rollin' Thunder - Driven by Mitchell "Monkey" Mclurg (Ignition-The Breaking Point).
 Rat-ified - Driven by Mitchell "Monkey" Mclurg.
 Flathead Fury - Driven by Mark "Markie" Wylde.
 Power Bomb - Driven by Unknown (Never shown in the movie; only a toy exclusive).
 Piledriver - Driven by Diesel "Porkchop" Riggs.
 Jack Hammer - Driven by Diesel "Porkchop" Riggs.
 Spinebuster - Driven by Mark "Markie" Wylde and Mitchell "Monkey" Mclurg.
 '70 Plymouth Roadrunner - Driven by Taro Kitano (Repainted World Race: Scorchers vehicle).
 Old Smokey - (Truck-type) Driven by Diesel "Porkchop" Riggs and Mitchell "Monkey" Mclurg. It is first shown delivering the new cars provided for the Metal Maniacs. It is destroyed in the Junk Realm when Pork Chop and Monkey decide to sacrifice it to prevent the Sweeper from destroying the Teku and Metal Maniacs. The truck bears a resemblance to either a Peterbilt 379 or a Kenworth W900.

Racing Drones
 RD-01 - Driven by RD-S1 (Never shown in the movie)
 RD-02 - Driven by RD-S1
 RD-03 - Driven by RD-L1 (or RD-S1, according to the Ignition DVD Bonus Features) (Never shown in the movie)
 RD-04 - Driven by RD-L1 (Never shown in the movie)
 RD-05 - Driven by RD-L1
 RD-06 - Driven by RD-S1
 RD-07 - (Motorcycle-type) Driven by MD-01/RD-M1
 RD-08 - Driven by RD-L1
 RD-09 - Driven by Gelorum
 RD-10 - Driven by RD-S1 (Never shown in the movie)
 Racing Drone Sweeper - Driven by Sweeper Drone Driver. Spawns MD-01s racing on RD-07, & RD-W1s to sabotage the Teku & Metal Maniacs' vehicles.
  Racing Drone Jet - Driven by RD-S1

Silencerz
 Carbide - Driven by Silencerz Driver (Never shown in the movie)
 Nitrium - Driven by Dr. Peter Tezla and Lani Tam
 Iridium - Driven by Silencerz Leader Driver "Major Jack Wheeler"
 Covelight - Driven by Silencerz Driver
 Accelium - Driven by Silencerz Driver
 Magnesium - (Motorcycle-type) Driven by Silencerz Leader Driver "Major Jack Wheeler"
 Octanium - Driven by Silencerz Driver (Never shown in the movie)
 Metaloid - Driven by Silencerz Driver (Never shown in the movie)
 Anthracite - Driven by Silencerz Driver and Silencerz Leader Driver "Major Jack Wheeler"
 Technetium - Driven by Silencerz Driver

Other Vehicles
 1955 Chevrolet Nomad - Driven by Lani Tam (Repainted into an Ambulance)
 Krazy 8s - Driven by Brian Kadeem
 Ballistik - Driven by Banjee Castillo (Shown in Swamp Realm)
 Shredster - (Part of the Dual Driller Hyperpod toy) 
 Sinistra- (Part of the Carpoon Hyperpod toy) 
 Whip Creamer II- (Part of the Slam Ram Hyperpod toy)

Hyperpods
 Octo-Rod Hyperpod - (Shown in Swamp, Metro and Ice Realm; Clarified in the Ignition DVD as the 'Caterpillar Hyperpod')
 Rocket Socket Hyperpod - (Shown in Storm, Water and Cosmic Realm; Clarified in the Ignition DVD as the 'Dragster Hyperpod')
 Climber Hyperpod - (Shown in Junk and Cosmic Realm)
 Slam Ram Hyperpod - (Racing Drones only)
 Dual Driller Hyperpod - (Shown in Swamp and Ruins Realm; Clarified in the Ignition DVD as the 'Drill Hyperpod')
 Carpoon Hyperpod - (Never shown in the movie, but the Harpoon from the Hyperpod has been seen briefly from Wylde's Spine Buster during Ignition)

See also
 Hot Wheels (1969-1971)
 Heroes on Hot Wheels (1991-1992)
 Hot Wheels: World Race (2003)
 Hot Wheels Battle Force 5 (2009-2011)
 Team Hot Wheels (2014-2017)

References

External links
 
 
 
 
 Accelepedia

Hot Wheels
American computer-animated films
Fictional racing drivers
Direct-to-video animated films
Films based on Mattel toys
Films about parallel universes
Films about wormholes
2005 direct-to-video films
Rainmaker Studios films
Animated films about auto racing
2000s American animated films
Canadian film series
Mass media franchises
American auto racing films
American action adventure films
2000s Canadian films